Cheshmandegan or Cheshm Andegan may refer to:
 Cheshmandegan-e Majid
 Cheshmandegan-e Olya
 Cheshmandegan-e Sofla